Admiral Makarov may refer to:

People

 Konstantin Makarov (1931–2011), Soviet Admiral of the Fleet
 Stepan Makarov (1849–1904), Russian vice admiral

Ships
 , commissioned in 2017
 , completed in 1975
  in service 1908–1922
 , formerly the German cruiser Nürnberg
 , a Kresta II-class cruiser in service 1972–1992
 Admiral Makarov, the United States Coast Guard vessel , lent to the Soviet Union between 1945 and 1949
 , a Soviet cargo liner, later the research vessel Vityaz

Other uses 
 Admiral Makarov State Maritime Academy